This is a list of notable people known for their research in biophysics.

A
 Gary Ackers (American, 1939–2011) — thermodynamics of protein assembly into complexes, protein-DNA interactions and enzyme subunit interactions
 David Agard
 Christian B. Anfinsen (American, 1916–1995) — author of the postulate about spontaneous protein folding, for which he received a Nobel Prize

B

 David Baker — Protein structure prediction; protein design; Rosetta software
 Adriaan (Ad) Bax (Dutch-born American, 1956–) — development of methodology for NMR (Nuclear magnetic resonance) spectroscopy
 Georg von Békésy (Hungarian, 1899–1972) — research on the human ear
 Boris Pavlovich Belousov — known for discovery of Belousov–Zhabotinsky reaction
 Howard Berg (American, 1934–2021) — characterized properties of bacterial chemotaxis
 Helen M. Berman (American, 1943–) — pioneer in study of nucleic acid structure; head of the worldwide Protein Data Bank
 John Desmond Bernal (Irish-born English, 1901–1971) — X-ray crystallography of plant viruses and proteins
 Pamela J. Bjorkman (American, 1956–) — first X-ray crystallography of human histocompatibility complex; studies immune recognition, homologs of MHC proteins, and improved antibodies against HIV
 Steven Block (American, 1952–) — observed the motions of enzymes such as kinesin and RNA polymerase with optical tweezers
Tom Blundell — crystal structures of HIV protease, renin, insulin and other hormones, growth factors, receptors, and proteins important in cell signalling and DNA repair; developed structure-guided and fragment-based approaches to drug design
 Jagadish Chandra Bose (Indian, 1858–1937)
 Detlev Wulf Bronk (American, 1897–1975) 
 Axel Brunger — developed the free R cross-validation index and the X-PLOR/CNS software for macromolecular crystallography
 Carlos Bustamante (Peruvian-born American, 1951–) —  known for single-molecule biophysics of molecular motors and biological polymer physics

C

 Charles Cantor — Director, Center for Advanced Biotechnology, Boston University. Cantor is a molecular geneticist who developed pulse field electrophoresis for very large DNA molecules with David C. Schwartz in 1984, by adding an alternating voltage gradient to standard gel electrophoresis. 
 Donald Caspar — theory of quasi-equivalence in icosahedral viruses
 Alexander Chizhevsky — founder of heliobiology
 Wah Chiu — cryo electron microscopy; virus structure; high-resolution cryoEM
 Steven Chu — Nobel laureate who helped develop optical trapping techniques used by many biophysicists
 G. Marius Clore  FRS (British and American) — pioneer of multidimensional macromolecular NMR spectroscopy laying foundations of 3D structure determination of proteins in solution, and discovery of rare, invisible conformational states of macromolecules
 Carolyn Cohen — in 1969, Cohen codiscovered the molecular structure of tropomyosin as a polar coiled coil, also being the first protein crystal structure determined with a  20Å resolution via x-ray crystallography. On the route to this discovery, she also discovered a novel crystal structure, termed the Cohen-Longley paracrystal with 400Å periodicity, in 1966. 
 Robert Corey — co-discoverer (with Linus Pauling) of the alpha helix and beta sheet structures in proteins
 Allan McLeod Cormack — development (with Godfrey Hounsfield) of computer assisted tomography
 Christoph Cremer — overcoming the conventional limit of resolution that applies to light based investigations (the Abbe limit) by a range of different methods like SPDM and SMI
 Francis Crick — co-discoverer of the structure of DNA. Later participated in the Crick, Brenner et al. experiment which established the basis for understanding the genetic code.

D
 Johann Deisenhofer (German and American) — solved first three-dimensional structure of membrane protein
 Max Delbrück — discovered that bacteria become resistant to phages as a result of genetic mutations. Delbrück, Salvador Luria, and Alfred Hershey shared the 1969 Nobel Prize in Physiology or Medicine "for their discoveries concerning the replication mechanism and the genetic structure of viruses"
 Emilio Del Giudice (Italian, 1940–2014) — water research
 Friedrich Dessauer — research on radiation, especially X-rays
 Ken A. Dill (American, 1947–) — research on folding pathways of proteins. 
 Christopher Dobson (British, 1949–2019) — protein folding and misfolding
 Jennifer Doudna (American, 1964–) — structures of large RNAs; pioneer in CRISPR research
 Leslie Dutton (British and American) — Oxidoreductase function and design.

E
 Richard H. Ebright — single-molecule enzymology; structure and function of RNA polymerases
 Gerald M. Edelman — Nobel laureate, structure of antibodies
 David Eisenberg
 Donald Engelman 
 Richard R. Ernst — developer of two-dimensional nuclear magnetic resonance spectroscopy

F
 George Feher (1924–2017)  — photosynthesis mechanisms for plants and bacteria
 Julio M. Fernandez
 Alan Fersht — pioneered work on protein folding
 Adolf Eugen Fick — responsible for Fick's law of diffusion and a method to determine cardiac output
 Joachim Frank — pioneered single-particle reconstruction in electron microscopy; studied structure and dynamics of ribosomes. 
 Rosalind Franklin  — pioneer of DNA crystallography and co-discoverer of the structure of DNA
 Clara Franzini-Armstrong 
 Hans Frauenfelder (1922–2022)  — pioneering work on experiment and theory to understand dynamic behavior in protein structure

G

 Luigi Galvani —  discoverer of bioelectricity
 Walter (Wally) Gilbert — Nobel laureate; introduced intron/exon concept, proposed RNA world hypothesis
 Martin Gruebele —  Protein Folding

H
 Taekjip Ha (South-Korean-born American, 1968–) — single-molecule biophysics
 Hermann von Helmholtz (Prussian-born German, 1821–1894) — first to measure the velocity of nerve impulses; studied hearing and vision
 Stefan Hell —  developed the principle of STED microscopy
 Richard Henderson —  scientist at the MRC Laboratory of Molecular Biology, developed the use of cryo-EM to study membrane protein structures.
 Wayne Hendrickson — developed robust methods of phasing and refinement for protein crystallography
 A.V. Hill (English, 1886–1977) — Nobel laureate, Hill coefficient for cooperativity in enzyme kinetics, physics of nerves and muscles
 Alan Hodgkin — mathematical theory of how ion fluxes produce nerve impulses (with Andrew Huxley)
 Dorothy Hodgkin (English, 1910–1994) — winner of the 1964 Nobel Prize in Chemistry, known for determining the structures of penicillin, vitamin B12, and insulin
 Alexander Hollaender (American, 1898–1986) — founded the science of radiation biology; early evidence for nucleic acid as the genetic material
 Barry H. Honig (American) — pioneered theory and computation for electrostatics in biological macromolecules
 John J. Hopfield —  worked on error correction in transcription and translation (kinetic proofreading), and associative memory models (Hopfield net)
 Arthur L. Horwich — chaperonins
 Godfrey Hounsfield — development (with Allan Cormack) of computer assisted tomography
 Wayne L. Hubbell — circa 1989, he oversaw the development of the technique termed site-directed spin labeling (SDSL), used for determining protein structure and dynamics through genetically creating an attachment point for a nitroxide spin labeled probe. The technique allows insight on the nature of how a protein's structure and conformational changes create/form protein function. 
 Andrew Huxley — mathematical theory of how ion fluxes produce nerve impulses (with Alan Hodgkin)
 Hugh Huxley (English, 1924–2013) — muscle structure and contraction
 James S. Hyde (American Biophysicist, 1934–) — Developer of EPR and MRI instrumentation, holder of 35 U.S. Patents

I
 Shinya Inoué (Japanese-born American, 1921–2019) — cytoskeletal dynamics

J
 Jagadish Chandra Bose — biologist, physicist, botanist, and an early writer of science fiction
Louise Johnson (English, 1940–2012) — Crystal structure of lysozyme (1st enzyme) with David Phillips, then glycogen phosphorylase. Wrote influential crystallography textbook with Tom Blundell.
 Pascual Jordan (German, 1902–1980)

K

 Martin Karplus (American, 1930–) — research on molecular dynamical simulations of biological macromolecules.
 Michael Kasha (American, 1920–2013) — founder of Institute of Molecular Biophysics at Florida State University
 Bernard Katz (British, 1911–2003) — discovered how synapses work
 Ephraim Katzir
 Walter Kauzmann — one of the first to recognize the role of hydrophobic effect in protein folding
 Jeffery W. Kelly — protein misfolding and aggregation
 John Kendrew (British, 1917–1997) — pioneer of protein crystallography
 Dorothee Kern
 Aaron Klug (British, 1926–2018) — winner of the 1982 Nobel Prize in Chemistry for his development of crystallographic electron microscopy and his structural elucidation of biologically important nucleic acid-protein complexes
 Brian Kobilka (American, 1955–) — winner of the 2012 Nobel Prize in Chemistry (with Robert Lefkowitz) for his work on the structure and activity of G-protein-coupled receptors
 Stephen Kowalczykowski — "visual biochemistry" of DNA repair and homologous recombination 
 John Kuriyan

L
 Robert S. Langer — biotechnology, drug delivery, and tissue engineering; Wolf Prize in Chemistry; Priestley Medal
 Paul Lauterbur —  development of magnetic resonance imaging
 Stephen D. Levene —  DNA-protein Interactions, DNA looping, and DNA topology
 Michael Levitt — winner of the 2013 Nobel Prize in Chemistry (with Arieh Warshel) for the development of multiscale models for complex chemical systems
 Karolin Luger — studies of chromatin and nucleosome structure.

M
 Roderick MacKinnon — determined first three-dimensional structure of voltage-gated transmembrane ion channel
 David H. MacLennan (Canadian)
 Marvin Makinen — pioneer of the structural basis of enzyme action
 Peter Mansfield — development of magnetic resonance imaging
 Brian W. Matthews (Australian-born American) — explicated the energetic and structural effects of mutations in proteins, using phage T4 lysozyme studied by protein crystallography
 Ann McDermott — study of biological samples using solid-state NMR
 Peter D. Mitchell — discovered the chemiosmotic mechanism of ATP synthesis
 Manuel Morales (Honduran-born American, 1919–2009) — molecular basis of muscle contraction
 Hermann Joseph Muller — discovered that X-rays cause mutations

N
 Erwin Neher — development of the patch clamp and single-channel recording (along with Bert Sakmann)
 Eva Nogales (Spanish) — electron microscopy; microtubule dynamics

O
 Seiji Ogawa (Japanese, 1934–) —  development of functional magnetic resonance imaging
 Wilma Olson  — Professor at Rutgers, pioneer in study of DNA structure

P

 George Palade — Nobel Laureate in physiology or medicine for protein secretion and cell ultra-structure from electron microscopy studies
 Linus Pauling — co-discoverer (with Robert Corey) of the alpha helix and beta sheet structures in proteins
 Max Perutz — pioneer of protein crystallography
 Ernest C. Pollard — founder of the Biophysical Society
 Fritz-Albert Popp (German, 1938–2018) — biophoton research and coherence systems in biology
 Bernard Pullman — pioneered applications of Quantum Chemistry in Biology

Q

R

 George Radda — early developer of Magnetic Resonance Imaging
 Gopalasamudram Narayana Iyer Ramachandran — famous for the Ramachandran plot of protein backbone conformation
 Venkatraman (Venki) Ramakrishnan (Indian-born American and British, 1952– ) — winner of 2009 Nobel Prize in Chemistry (with Steitz and Yonath) for crystal structure of the 30S subunit of the bacterial ribosome
 Ayyalusamy Ramamoorthy — solid-state NMR
 John Randall — X-ray and neutron diffraction of proteins and DNA
 Zihe Rao (Chinese) — structural biologist, member Chinese Academy of Sciences, president of Nankai University
 Nicolas Rashevsky, former Editor of the first journal of mathematical and theoretical biophysics entitled " The Bulletin of Mathematical Biophysics " (1940–1973) and author of the two-factor model of neuronal excitation, biotopology and organismic set theory
 Frederic M. Richards 
 Jane Richardson (American, 1941–) — developed the ribbon diagram for representing the 3D structure of proteins; with husband David, developed MolProbity structure-validation web service
 Robert Rosen — theoretical biophysicist and mathematical biologist, author of: metabolic-replication systems, categories of metabolic and genetic networks, quantum genetics in terms of von Neumann's approach, non-reductionist complexity theories, dynamical and anticipatory systems in biology.
 Michael Rossmann — worked with Max Perutz on the crystal structure of hemoglobin, then in his own lab solved structures of enzymes including lactate dehydrogenase, the prototype of the Rossmann fold, and of many viruses including the common cold virus.
 Benoit Roux — continues to conduct research at the University of Chicago in classical molecular dynamics and other theoretical techniques to determine the function of biological systems on the molecular level. He is a distinguished pioneer in the study of membrane proteins and bridging the gap between theoretical and experimental biophysics through computation.

S
 Erich Sackmann — founder of the bottom-up approach to understanding of the cell mechanics and adhesion
 Bert Sakmann — development of the patch clamp and single-channel recording (along with Erwin Neher)
 Francis O. Schmitt (American, 1903–1995)
 Simon Shnoll — worked in the fields of chemical clocks, Chronobiology and Astrobiology.
 Timothy Springer
 James Spudich — molecular motors
 Thomas A. Steitz
 Lubert Stryer
 Attila Szabo — Founders award of the Biophysical Society for theoretical analysis of biophysics experiments

T

 Janet Thornton (British, 1949–) — Director of the European Bioinformatics Institute; early pioneer in structural and functional bioinformatics, including the development of ProCheck for structure validation and CATH for protein structure classification
 Nikolay Timofeev-Ressovsky — one of pioneers in radiation biology
 Ignacio Tinoco
 Chikashi Toyoshima — Ca-ATPase ion pump
 Roger Tsien — Nobel laureate who pioneered the use of green fluorescent protein for biological imaging

V
 Jerome Vinograd — developed density gradient ultracentrifugation
 Steven Vogel — biomechanics
 Mikhail Volkenshtein

W

 Douglas Warrick — specializing in bird flight (hummingbirds and pigeons)
 Arieh Warshel (Israeli-born American, 1940–) — development of QM/MM approaches for a quantitative understanding of enzymatic reactions; introduction of molecular dynamics simulations in biology; introduction of consistent electrostatic calculations in proteins.
 James D. Watson — co-discoverer of the structure of DNA.
 Anthony Watts — early proponent of the idea of both structural and functional significance of “Lipid-protein interactions”, and developer of solid state NMR for biology.
 Watt W. Webb — developer of multiphoton microscopy
 Gregorio Weber
 John Wikswo — research on biomagnetism and cardiac electrophysiology
 Don Craig Wiley — applied molecular biophysics to study of viruses
 Maurice Wilkins (New Zealand-born British, 1916–2004) — pioneer of DNA crystallography and co-discoverer of the structure of DNA.
 Kurt Wüthrich — Nobel Laureate in physiology or medicine for 2D-FT NMR of protein structure in solution

X
 Sunney Xie — single-molecule enzymology

Y

 King-Wai Yau (Chinese-born American, 1948–) — fundamental contributions to understanding the mechanisms of sensory transduction in rod, cone, and non-image visual systems and in olfaction
 Ada Yonath (Israeli, 1939–) — winner of the 2009 Nobel Prize in Chemistry (with Steitz and Ramakrishnan) for solving the crystal structure of the large subunit of the ribosome
 Douglas Youvan — light reactions of photosynthesis, genetic code, imaging spectroscopy and directed evolution

Z
 Bruno Zimm — co-developer of the Zimm-Bragg model of helix formation

See also
 List of members of the National Academy of Sciences (Biophysics and computational biology)
 Heineken Prizes
 Alexander Hollaender Award in Biophysics

References

biophysicists